The 99th Light Infantry Division was raised in November 1940 and remained in training at Bad Kissingen until the summer of 1941. In June it took part in Operation Barbarossa—the German invasion of the Soviet Union—and operated in Poland and Ukraine under Army Group South until the fall, when it was withdrawn to Germany for reorganization as the 7th Mountain Division.

In early 1942 the 7th Mountain Division was transferred to serve under the 20th Mountain Army in Lapland, and remained there until it withdrew into Norway at the beginning of 1945. It surrendered to the British there at the end of the war in May.

War Crimes

The 99th division participated in the Massacre at Babi Yar

References 

Note: The Web references may require you to follow links to cover the unit's entire history.
 Pipes, Jason. "7th Gebirgsjager Division". Retrieved April 14, 2005.
 Wendel, Marcus (2004). "". Retrieved April 14, 2005.
 "99. leichte Infanterie-Division". German language article at www.lexikon-der-wehrmacht.de. Retrieved April 14, 2005.

0*099
Military units and formations established in 1940
Military units and formations disestablished in 1945